Dharmavaram may refer to places in India:

Places

Andhra Pradesh, India 

Dharmavaram, Anantapur district in Andhra Pradesh
Dharmavaram revenue division, Anantapur district
Dharmavaram, Vizianagaram district in Andhra Pradesh
Dharmavaram, West Godavari district in Andhra Pradesh
Dharmavaram, Guntur district in Andhra Pradesh

Transport 
Dharmavaram Junction railway station, Anantapur